Live in Galway is a live album by Irish singer Mary Coughlan that was released in 1996.

Track listing 
 "The Laziest Gal in Town" (Cole Porter) – 3:10
 "The Beach" (Erik Visser, A. Hensey) – 3:37
 "Hearts" (Jacques Brel) – 3:14
 "Country Fair Dance" (Gerry O'Beirne) – 3:44
 "I Want to Be Seduced" (Gary Tigerman, Graceland McCollough Tigers) – 2:56
 "Ancient Rain" (J. McCarthy) – 7:01
 "Sweet Victim" (J. McCarthy) – 4:40
 "Not up to Scratch" (de Groot, Nijgh) – 4:29
 "Just a Friend" (Lambrecht, Schoovaerts, Schoufs) – 3:28
 "Blue Surrender" (D. Long) – 4:30
 "Magdalen Laundry" (Johnny Mulhern) – 6:47
 "My Land Is Too Green" (Erik Visser, A. Hensey) – 3:53
 "Delaney" (Johnny Mulhern) – 4:28
 "Nobody's Business (Tango)" (Porter Grainger, Everett Robbins) – 4:47

References

Mary Coughlan (singer) albums
1996 live albums